Schistura niulanjiangensis is a species of ray-finned fish, a stone loach, in the genus Schistura from the Yangtze drainage in Yunnan. It has been placed in the genus Claea by some authorities but this genus is listed as monotypic in Fishbase.

References

niulanjiangensis
Fish described in 2006